Chyornaya River or Chorna River (sometimes ), literally "Black River", is a common name for many rivers in Russia and Ukraine. 

The Russian name (Black) is often transliterated as Chernaya, and alternatively as Chyornaya or Chornaya, which are closer to the true pronunciation.

Chyornaya (Crimea), a river in Crimea, Ukraine, also known as the Chorhun, Chornaya or Tchornaya River
Chyornaya (Veslyana), a tributary of the Veslyana in Perm Krai and Komi Republic, Russia
Chyornaya Rechka (Saint Petersburg), a small river in Saint Petersburg, also known as the Black River, famous for being the place of the duel of Alexander Pushkin and Georges d'Anthès

See also 
 Chyornaya rechka